Raema Lisa Rumbewas (born 10 September 1980) is a former Indonesian weightlifter. She is the country's first athlete to have won medals in three Olympic Games. She competed in the women's 48 kg at the 2000 Summer Olympics and won silver with 185.0 kg in total. She won another silver medal at the 2004 Games, this time competing in the women's 53 kg and lifting 210.0 kg in total. Another 210.0 kg was enough to win yet another silver medal at the 2006 World Weightlifting Championships in Santo Domingo. At the 2008 Summer Olympics she ranked 3rd in the 53 kg category, with a total of 206 kg.

She has been a scholarship holder with the Olympic Solidarity program since February 2003.

Personal life
She is the cousin of women doubles badminton player Nitya Krishinda Maheswari who participated in the 2016 Summer Olympics in Rio de Janeiro, Brazil. She is from Irian Jaya province, now Papua.

Notes and references

External links
 Athlete Biography at beijing2008

1980 births
Living people
Papuan people
People from Jayapura
Indonesian Christians
Weightlifters at the 2000 Summer Olympics
Weightlifters at the 2004 Summer Olympics
Weightlifters at the 2008 Summer Olympics
Olympic weightlifters of Indonesia
Olympic silver medalists for Indonesia
Olympic medalists in weightlifting
Asian Games medalists in weightlifting
Weightlifters at the 2002 Asian Games
Weightlifters at the 2006 Asian Games
Weightlifters at the 2010 Asian Games
Medalists at the 2004 Summer Olympics
Indonesian female weightlifters
Medalists at the 2000 Summer Olympics
Asian Games bronze medalists for Indonesia
Medalists at the 2002 Asian Games
Sportspeople from Papua
Southeast Asian Games silver medalists for Indonesia
Southeast Asian Games bronze medalists for Indonesia
Southeast Asian Games gold medalists for Indonesia
Southeast Asian Games medalists in weightlifting
Competitors at the 2001 Southeast Asian Games
Olympic bronze medalists for Indonesia
World Weightlifting Championships medalists
West Papuan people